Vashan (also Romanized as Vāshān and Vashon; also known as Vāshau) is a village in Shakhen Rural District, in the Central District of Birjand County, South Khorasan Province, Iran. At the 2016 census, its population was 398, in 122 families.

References 

Populated places in Birjand County